Jimmy Morris (16 July 1891 – 30 May 1971) was an Australian rules footballer who played for Carlton in the Victorian Football League (VFL).

Morris was recruited from Shepparton in the Goulburn Valley Football Netball League and made his debut against St Kilda late in the 1914 VFL season and the following week kicked three goals in a win over Richmond. He kept his place in the team for the finals and in just his fifth league game was the rover in Carlton's victorious 1914 Grand Final side.

In 1915 he missed just two games all year and was again a premiership player, this time as a wingman. He made just one appearance in 1916, as a centreman in the Grand Final, but this time experienced a loss.

This gave him the unusual distinction of appearing in three VFL Grand Finals from his first 25 games. He participated in one further league game the following season and never appeared for Carlton again.

References

Holmesby, Russell and Main, Jim (2007). The Encyclopedia of AFL Footballers. 7th ed. Melbourne: Bas Publishing.
Blueseum profile

1891 births
Carlton Football Club players
Carlton Football Club Premiership players
Australian rules footballers from Victoria (Australia)
Shepparton Football Club players
1971 deaths
People from Shepparton
Two-time VFL/AFL Premiership players